Mildred Mehle (née Folkestad, August 24, 1904 – February 16, 1987) was a Norwegian actress. She appeared in three films between 1929 and 1931.

Family
Mildred Mehle was the daughter of the painter Bernhard Folkestad and Kari Selvig Folkestad (1884–1926). Her first marriage was to the Norwegian radio personality Eyvind Mehle, and her second to the Swedish actor Edvin Adolphson. She was the mother of the singer Olle Adolphson and the actress Kristina Adolphson.

Filmography
1929: Frøken statsadvokat
1930: Kristine Valdresdatter as a farm girl
1931: Halvvägs til himlen

References

External links
 
 Mildred Mehle at the Swedish Film Database

1904 births
1987 deaths
20th-century Norwegian actresses
Actresses from Oslo